Bethioua is a district in Oran Province, Algeria, on the Mediterranean Sea. It was named after its capital, Bethioua.

Municipalities
The district is further divided into 3 municipalities:
Bethioua
Mers El Hadjadj
Aïn Bya

References

Districts of Oran Province